Rossia pacifica diegensis is a subspecies of bobtail squid native to the eastern Pacific Ocean off Santa Catalina Basin, California. It occurs at greater depths than its sister taxon R. p. pacifica.

This subspecies is smaller and more delicate in structure than R. p. pacifica. Relative to its mantle size, it possesses larger fins and arm suckers, the latter being predominantly arranged in two rows.

The type specimen was collected off California and is deposited at the National Museum of Natural History in Washington, D.C.

The validity of R. p. diegensis has been questioned.

References

External links

Bobtail squid
Endemic fauna of California
Western North American coastal fauna
Molluscs of the Pacific Ocean
Marine molluscs of North America
Molluscs of the United States
Natural history of the Channel Islands of California
Subspecies
Taxa named by Samuel Stillman Berry
Fauna without expected TNC conservation status